Farmers Loop is a census-designated place in Fairbanks North Star Borough, Alaska, United States. One of several CDPs created out of various Fairbanks suburbs and outskirts during the 2010 census, at which time it had a population of 4,853. The CDP is located north of Fairbanks and is centered on and named for Farmers Loop Road, a road that runs along the foothills north of Fairbanks between the Steese Highway and the northeastern corner of the University of Alaska Fairbanks campus.

Demographics

References

External links
 Map of the CDP from the Alaska Department of Labor and Workforce Development

Census-designated places in Fairbanks North Star Borough, Alaska